Alhierd Bacharevič (Alhierd Bacharevič in Belarusian Łacinka; born 31 January 1975 in Minsk) is a Belarusian writer and translator (his actual first name is Aljeh (Алег) ).
In 1997 he graduated from the Philological Faculty of the Belarusian Pedagogical University in Minsk. Afterward, Bacharevič worked as a teacher of Belarusian and then as a journalist. His first texts were published in 1993. In the 1990s, he was one of the founders of the Belarusian literary and artistic avantgarde group Bum-Bam-Lit. In 1998, this group published the now cult anthology of their poetry, namely, Tazik biełaruski ('The Belarusian Basin'). At that time Bacharevič married Ksienija Brečka (Ксенія Брэчка). They have one daughter, Uljana (Ульяна). Between 2007 and 2013, Bacharevič lived in Hamburg, Germany. In 2013, he returned to Minsk and married the Belarusian translator and poet, Julia Cimafiejeva (Юля Цімафеева Yulya Tsimafeyeva). They lived in the Belarusian capital and cooperated in the field of Belarusian literature and culture, until the Belarusian White Revolution of Dignity in 2020–2021. Subsequently, in order to avoid arbitrary imprisonment and torture, the couple of authors chose emigration and left for Austria.

Writing career

Alhierd Bacharevič is the leading Belarusian-language author of novels, including the novels Magpie on the Gallows (Сарока на шыбеніцы, 2009), and Šabany: The Story of One Disappearance (Шабаны. Гісторыя аднаго зьнікненьня, 2012), Alindarka’s Children (Дзеці Аліндаркі, 2014), or White Fly, Murderer of Men (Белая муха, забойца мужчын, 2015). The publishing house Lohvinaŭ published an over 900-page novel in six parts Dogs of Europe (Сабакі Эўропы, 2017), which is deemed to be the writer's opus magnum. The novel received in Belarus the Book of the Year award and was noted in Belarus with the independent Reader's Prize and the second Jerzy Gedroyc Prize. In 2019, the Moscow publishing house Vremia published the Russian translation of this novel (Собаки Европы).

The works by Alhierd Bacharevič were translated into English, French, German, Czech, Ukrainian, Bulgarian, Slovene, Russian, Polish, Lithuanian. In 2008, a collection by Alhierd Bacharevič's selected stories was translated into Polish "Talent do jąkania się". In 2010, in Leipzig, the novel Magpie on the Gallows was published in German in the translation by Thomas Weiler. In 2015, the story of Bakharevich The Talent of Stuttering was included in the anthology of the best European short prose "Best European Fiction". In 2017, the Small Medical Encyclopedia by Bacharevič was published in Polish in the Lublin Warsztaty Kultury publishing house (translated by Mira Luksha). In 2018, the novel Children of Alindarki was published by the publishing house "Le ver a soie" in the French translation of Alena Lapatnoiva.

Alhierd Bacharevič translated the fairy tale The Cold Heart by Wilhelm Hauff, which was published at the end of 2009 under one cover with an independent work entitled The Translator's Afterword. Translated from the German language, individual works of the brothers Grimm, Franz Kafka, G. G. Evers, poems by Hans Enzensberger and other modern German poets and the novel by the modern German writer Kathrin Schmidt You will not die. He took part in the Berlin Literary Colloquium, the Theater Festival in Lublin (Poland), the Literary Festivals Vilenica (Slovenia), the Lesefest Osteuropa (Leipzig, Germany), The Month of Author Reading in Brno, international literary festivals in Sweden, Ukraine, Lithuania, Czech Republic and others. He has performed at international book fairs in Frankfurt, Leipzig, Warsaw, Lviv, Minsk. In 2014, he represented Belarus at the International European Writers Conference in Berlin.

In 2012, after the members' angry reaction to the publication of Alhierd Bacharevič's essay The Dark Past of Kayan Lupaki on Janka Kupała in 2011, he left the Union of Belarusian Writers. He had been a member of this Union since 2006. Bacharevič is a member of the Belarusian PEN Club.

In 2015, a performance was staged on the Small Stage of the Yanka Kupala State Theater based on the novel Šabany by Alhierd Bacharevič.

In mid-2020 Bacharevič resigned from continuing work on his new fantasy-cum-political fiction novel Сьвятая Кацярына Śviataja Kaciaryna [Saint Catherine] (after having completed over 400 pages), because unexpectedly the socio-political reality of the Belarusian pro-democracy Peaceful Revolution accelerated beyond the book's original plot. The novel coalesced around the arrival of a female etxraterrestrial on Earth and the revolution that she triggered. However, in the author's words, 'Mrs Śviatłana Cichanoŭskaja fell from the sky to Minsk, so the manuscript was set aside,' because meanwhile, according to Bacharevič, a peaceful revolution commenced in Belarus. The novelist proposes that despite violent repressions this revolution still continues, directed against the 'regime of the fascist type.'

Following the Belarus's involvement in the Russian invasion of Ukraine in 2022, on 2 March 2022, Bacharevič's open letter to the Ukrainians was published, in which he stated: 'I am prepared to take upon myself the shame and disgrace of Belarus for what is happening – in exactly the same way as German writers in the emigration did in the times of the Second World War'.

Due to his principled stance, the Belarusian regime's propagandists began to attack and denigrate Bacharevič in the pro-regime Belarusian press. On 17 May 2022, his novel Сабакі Эўропы Sabaki Eŭropy [Dogs of Europe] was banned in Belarus by placing it on the 'list of extremist material.' In mid-June 2022, the Belarusian Ministry of Education ordered the country's school libraries to be cleansed of the books by over 30 proscribed 'extremist' writers, including. In late July 2022, the authorities decided that the confiscated copies of Bacharevič's 'extremist' novel Сабакі Эўропы Sabaki Eŭropy [Dogs of Europe] would be destroyed by ploughing them by a tractor into a field.

Novels, volumes of short stories and essays
 2002 – Практычны дапаможнік па руйнаваньні гарадоў. Проза, 1997–2001 Praktyčny dapamožnik pa rujnavańni haradoŭ. Proza, 1997–2001 [A Practical Guide to Ruining Cities: Stories, 1997–2001]. St Petersburg: Run' and Vilnius: OOO Nevskii prostor. 
 2003 – Натуральная афарбоўка. Раман і апавяданні Naturalnaja afarboŭka. Raman i apaviadanni [Natural Dye: A Novel and Stories]. Miensk: Lohvinaŭ. 
 2006 – Ніякай літасьці Валянціне Г. Апавяданні Nijakaj litaści Valiancinie H. Apaviadanni [No Mercy for Valiancina H.: Stories]. Miensk: Lohvinaŭ. 
 2008 – Праклятыя госьці сталіцы Prakliatyja hości stalicy [Damned Guests of the Capital]. Miensk: Lohvinaŭ. 
 2008 – Talent do jąkania się / Талент заіканьня [Talent for Stuttering] (a bilingual collection of short stories in Belarusian and Polish translation). Wrocław: Kolegium Europy Wschodniej im. Jana Nowaka-Jeziorańskiego. 
 2009 – Сарока на шыбеніцы Saroka na šybienicy [Magpie on the Gallows]. Miensk: Lohvinaŭ. 
 German translation: Die Elster auf dem Galgen [translated from the Belarusian by Thomas Weiler] (Ser: Neue Prosa Osteuropa-Bibliothek). 2010. Leipzig: Leipziger Literaturverlag. 
 Polish translation: Sroka na szubienicy [translated from the Belarusian by Igor Maksymiuk and Jan Maksymiuk] (Ser: Meridian). 2021. Sejny: Pogranicze, 456pp. 
 2009 – Introduction to and the Belarusian translation from the German of Халоднае сэрца: казка Chałodnaje serca: kazka [Das kalte Herz / The Cold Heart] by Вільгельм Гаўф Wilhelm Hauff. Miensk: Halijafy. 
 2011 – Малая мэдычная энцыкляпэдыя Бахарэвіча Malaja medyčnaja encykliapedyja Bachareviča  [Bacharevič's Small Medical Encyclopedia]. Prague: Radyjo Svaboda. 
 Polish translation: Mały leksykon medyczny według Bacharewicza [translated by Mirosława Łuksza]. Lublin: Warsztaty Kultury. 
 2012 – Шабаны. Гісторыя аднаго зьнікненьня Šabany. Historyja adnaho źniknieńnia [Šabany: The Story of One Disappearance]. Miensk: Halijafy.  (2nd edition in 2015)
 Theater adaptation: Šabany (directed by Алена Ганум Aljena Hanum). 2014. Miensk: Janka Kupała National Theatre.
 2012 – Гамбурскі рахунак Бахарэвіча Hamburski rachunak Bachareviča [Bacharevič's Hamburg Account]. Prague: Radyjo Svaboda and Miensk: Lohvinaŭ. 
 2014 – Каляндар Бахарэвіча Kaliandar Bachareviča [Bacharevič's Calendar]. Prague: Radyjo Svaboda. 
 2014 – Ніякай літасьці Альгерду Б. Nijakaj litaści Alhierdu B. [No Mercy for Alhierd B.]. Miensk: Halijafy. 
 2014 – Дзеці Аліндаркі Dzieci Alindarki [Alindarka's Children]. Miensk: Halijafy. 
 French translation: Les enfants d'Alendrier [translated from the Belarusian by Alena Lapatniova] (Ser: 200 000 signes). 2018. Les Essarts-le-Roi: le Ver à soie-Virginie Symaniec éditrice. 
 Scots-English translation: Alindarka's Children [Belarusian-language sections translated into Scots by Petra Reid; Russian-language sections translated into English by Jim Dingley]. 2020. Edinburgh: Scotland Street Press, 188pp. .
 US edition: Alindarka's Children [Belarusian-language sections translated into Scots by Petra Reid; Russian-language sections translated into English by Jim Dingley]. 2020. New York: New Directions.
 2015 – Белая муха, забойца мужчын Biełaja mucha, zabojca mužčyn [White Fly, Men Killer]. Miensk: Halijafy. 
 Russian translation: Белая муха, убийца мужчин Belaia mukha, ubiitsa muzhchin [translated from the Belarusian by Alhierd Bacharevič]. 2017. Miensk: Halijafy. 
 2016 – Бэзавы і чорны. Парыж праз акуляры беларускай літаратуры Bezavy i čorny. Paryž praz akuliary biełaruskaj litaratury [Lilac and Black: Paris Through the Prism of Belarusian Literature]. Miensk: Zimcier Kołas. 
 2017 – Сабакі Эўропы Sabaki Eŭropy [Dogs of Europe]. Vilnius: Lohvinaŭ. 
 Russian translation: Собаки Европы Sobaki Evropy [translated from the Belarusian by Alhierd Bacharevič] (Ser: Samoe vremia!). 2019. Moscow: Vremia. 
 Theater adaptation (1, in English): Belarus Free Theatre. 2019. Dogs of Europe (directed by Mikałaj Chaliezin)
 Theater adaptation (2, in Polish): Independent Theater Group Kupalaŭcy. 2022. Gęsi – ludzie – łabędzie [Geese – People – Swans] (directed by Aliaksandar Harcujeŭ). Lublin: Juliusz Osterwa Theater.
 German translation: Die Hunde Europas [translated from the Belarusian by Thomas Weiler]. 2024 [Forthcoming]. Berlin: Verlag Voland & Quist.<ref>Nina Weller and Yaraslava Ananka. 2020. Weltliteratur aus Belarus: Gespräch mit Al’herd Bacharevič und Thomas Weiler. 'novinki. 12 Jul.]</ref>
 2018 – Мае дзевяностыя Maje dzievianostyja [My 1990s]. Miensk: A. M. Januškievič. Tomasz Kamusella. 2019. Belarusian Culture: Still a Terra Incognita: A Review of Alhierd Bacharevič’s Maje Dzievianostyja (My 1990s). New Eastern Europe. 5 Jun
 2nd edition, 2021, Miensk: A. M. Januškievič. 
 2019 – Berlin, Paris und das Dorf. Essays [Berlin, Paris and the Village: Essays] [translated from the Belarusian into German by Thomas Weiler and Tina Wünschmann]. Berlin: edition.fotoTAPETA, 96 pp. 
 2020 – Апошняя кніга пана А. Apošniaja kniha pana A. [Mr. A's Latest Book]. Prague: Viasna and Miensk: A. M. Januškievič, 500pp.
 2021 – Sie haben schon verloren. Revolution und Revolte in Belarus [They Have Already Lost: Revolution and Revolt in Belarus]. Berlin: edition.fotoTAPETA, 70 pp. BELARUS – Aufstand der Frauen (Women's Uprising). 28 May 2021.
 2021 – Плошча Перамогі Płošča Peramohi [Victory Square], 160 pp (e-book). 
 2021 – Тэатр шчаслівых дзяцей Teatr ščaślivych dziaciej [The Theater of Happy Children], 170 pp (e-book). .Альгерд Бахарэвіч: У жніўні каля Стэлы падышла жанчына: «Вы ж напішаце пра нас усіх раман, праўда?» І я паабяцаў, што напішу. 2021. Наша Ніва. 5 Apr. (A single paper copy of this novel was published, as a performance act of creative art, for a charity auction. The successful anonymous buyer paid €1,250. All proceeds from the auction were used to support repressed authors and cultural activists in Belarus).
 2021 – Хлопчык і снег Chłopčyk i śnieh [The Little Boy and Snow] (forthcoming). (An autobiography devoted to the author's childhood in the Soviet Union; a prequel to the 2018 volume Мае дзевяностыя Maje dzievianostyja [My 1990s].) Miensk: A. M. Januškievič.

Poetry and short stories
 2019 Spomenik Običnom Čovjeku [A Monument to the Common Man] (poem translated from the Belarusian into Croatian by Vesna Vaško Cáceres and Siarhiej Šupa]. Ajfelov most. May 5. (NB: The Belarusian-language original Помнік простаму чалавеку Pomnik prostamu čałavieku circulates on the web.)
 2022 Vieršy Вершы  [Poems]. Prague: Vydaviectva Viasna Выдавецтва Вясна., 142pp. NB: Each poem is given in Łacinka and Cyrillic. Alhierd Bacharevič. VIERŠY.

Essays
 2020 Последнее слово детства. Фашизм как воспоминание Poslednee slovo detstva. Fashizm kak vospominanie [The Last Glimpse of Childhood: Fascism as Memory]. pen/opp: Swedish PEN: Freedom of Expression, Literature and Culture. 7 Dec.Альгерд Бахаревич. 2020. Последнее слово детства. Фашизм как воспоминание. Свободные новости. 5 Nov.
 English translation: Fascism as Memory [translated from Russian by Jim Dingley]. 2020. pen/opp: Swedish PEN: Freedom of Expression, Literature and Culture. 7 Dec.
 German translation: Mit der Angst um den Hals [translated from the Russian by Mariya Donska and Gisela Zeindlinger]. 2021. Dekoder. 5 Jan
 Swedish translation: Fascismen vi minns. 2020. pen/opp: Swedish PEN: Freedom of Expression, Literature and Culture. 7 Dec.
 Ukrainian translation: Останнє слово дитинства. Фашизм як спогад Ostannye slovo dytynstva. Fashyzm iak spohad [translated from the Russian by Ія Ківа Iia Kiva]. 2020. Український центр Міжнародного ПЕН-клубу/PEN Ukraine. 29 Dec.
 2021 Worte kommen immer zu spät [Words Always Come Too Late]. 2021. Frankfurter Allgemeine Zeitung. 28 May.
 2022 Fqinjët që nuk kanë qenë kurrë të tillë [Neighbors, Who never Were]. 2022. Gazeta Express. 8 Jun [ Bardhyl Selimi's Albanian translation of Tomasz Kamusella's English translation of the Belarusian original: ‘Суседзі, якіх не было Susiedzi, jakich nie było’ (pp. 68–72). In: Альгерд Бахарэвіч Alhierd Bacharevič. 2014. Ніякай літасьці Альгерду Б. Nijakaj litaści Alhierdu B. Мінск Minsk: Галіяфы Halijafy. ]

Bacharevič's Translations
 2009 – Халоднае сэрца: казка Chałodnaje serca: kazka [Das kalte Herz / The Cold Heart] by Вільгельм Гаўф Wilhelm Hauff. Miensk: BiełTonMedyja. NB: E-book & audiobook. . Translation of Wilhelm Hauff. Das kalte Herz.
 2011 – Ты не памрэш Ty nie pamreš [You Will Not Die]. Miensk: Makbeł. . Translation of Kathrin Schmidt. Du stirbst nicht. Cologne: Kiepenheuer & Witsch.
 2013 – Казкі братоў Грымаў Kazki bratoŭ Hrymaŭ [ Grimms' Fairy Tales ]. Vilnius: Lohvinaŭ.
 2015 – Халоднае сэрца: казка Chałodnaje serca: kazka [Das kalte Herz / The Cold Heart] by Вільгельм Гаўф Wilhelm Hauff. Miensk: Knihazbor. . Translation of Wilhelm Hauff's Das kalte Herz.
 2017 – Белая муха, убийца мужчин Belaia mukha, ubiitsa muzhchin [White Fly, Men Killer]. Miensk: Halijafy. . Translation of Alhierd Bacharevič. Белая муха, забойца мужчын Biełaja mucha, zabojca mužčyn. Miensk: Halijafy.
 2018 – Што было б Što było b [Was gewesen wäre / What Would Be] by Грэгар Зандэр Gregor Sander. Miensk: Lohvinau. . Translation of Georg Sander's Was gewesen wäre.
 2019 – Собаки Европы Sobaki Evropy [Dogs of Europe]. Moscow: Vremia. . Translation of Alhierd Bacharevič. Сабакі Эўропы Sabaki Eŭropy [Dogs of Europe]. Vilnius: Lohvinaŭ.

Awards
 Winner of the 2002 award "Hliniany Viales" (Clay Wreath), for the collection of stories Практычны дапаможнік па руйнаваньні гарадоў. Проза, 1997–2001 Praktyčny dapamožnik pa rujnavańni haradoŭ. Proza, 1997–2001 [A Practical Guide to Ruining Cities: Stories, 1997–2001]
 Winner of the "Book of the Year 2012: Jerzy Giedroyc Literary Award: Second Place", for the collection of essays Малая мэдычная энцыкляпэдыя Бахарэвіча Malaja medyčnaja encykliapedyja Bachareviča  [Bacharevič's Small Medical Encyclopedia]
 Winner of the "Book of the Year 2013: Jerzy Giedroyc Literary Award: Second Place", for the collections of essays on Belarusian literature and writers Гамбурскі рахунак Бахарэвіча Hamburski rachunak Bachareviča [Bacharevič's Hamburg Account]
 Winner of the Belarusian PEN Center's award "Book of the Year 2014", for the novel Дзеці Аліндаркі Dzieci Alindarki [Alindarka's Children].
 Winner of the "Book of the Year 2015: Jerzy Giedroyc Literary Award: Third Place", for the novel Дзеці Аліндаркі Dzieci Alindarki [Alindarka's Children].
 Winner of the Belarusian PEN Center's award "Book of the Year 2017", for the novel Сабакі Эўропы Sabaki Eŭropy [Dogs of Europe]
 Winner of the award "Book of the Year 2018: Jerzy Giedroyc Literary Award: Second Place", for the novel Сабакі Эўропы Sabaki Eŭropy [Dogs of Europe].Лаўрэатам IV літаратурнай прэміі „Кніга года" стаў Альгерд БахарэвічЧытай больш на: https://www.racyja.com/kultura/laureatam-iv-litaraturnaj-premii-kniga/
 Readers' Prize (2018) for the novel Сабакі Эўропы Sabaki Eŭropy [Dogs of Europe]Чытачы пачалі збор грошай на прэмію Бахарэвічу за «Сабакаў Эўропы». 2018. Радыё Свабода. 17 Oct
 Winner of the 34th Erwin-Piscator-Preis (2021) awarded for 'his powerful work as one of the most significant Belarusian writers, exploring the conditions of totalitarian rule in monumental novels and profound essays.'

Creative writing fellowships
 IHAG (Internationales Haus der AutorInnen, Graz, Austria), 2006
 German PEN Center, Writers in Exile Grant, 2008–2011
 Heinrich Böll Foundation, 201120 Jahre Heinrich Böll-Haus. 2011, p 5
 Baltic Writers and Translators Center, Visby
 Institut Français, Center International de Recollets, 2016Littérature Biélorussienne à Paris. 2016. 19 Mar
 Literarisches Colloquium Berlin, 2018
 "Writer in Exile"-Programm, City of Graz, Internationales Haus der Autorinnen und Autoren Graz, Kulturvermittlung Steiermark. 2020–2021,Julia Cimafiejeva,  Alhierd Bacharevic, aus Minsk Writer in Exile Dez. 2020 – Jun. 2021. Internationales Haus der Autorinnen und Autoren Graz, Cultural City Network Graz. Kulturvermittlung Steiermark. prolonged until December 2022.

Facts

In the 1990s he was the founder and vocalist of the first Belarusian-language punk band Правакацыя ('Provocation').Pravakacyja: Ten Best HitsБахарэвіч сьпяваў у Менску: «Правакацыя» на сцэне ў «Графіці». Радыё Свабода. 04 лістапад 2016

In March 2022 Bacharevič publicly expressed his opinion about the Russian invasion in Ukraine and declared that “we have the same enemy: the Belarusians, the Ukrainians, the Lithuanians, and even the Russians. And this enemy is Putin's empire, Putinism, Putin's fascism!”.

References

External links

 Побег из Беларуси. 2021. Эхо Кавказа. 20 Oct.
 Okrugli stol: Julia Cimafiejeva i Alhierd Bacharevič. 2021. Knjižara Fraktura and Fraktura Najbolja Literatura (Croatia). 8 Sept. (simultaneous translation into Croatian)
 МАРИЯ МЕЛЁХИНА. 2021. «Мы уже победили — и за это нас расстреляют». Большое интервью с Бахаревичем — главным «экстремистом» беларуской литературы {"We have already won – and for this we will be shot:" A long interview with Bacharevič – the main "extremist" of Belarusian literature}. KYKY. 27 Apr.
 [https://web.archive.org/web/20101123035517/http://democraticbelarus.eu/node/6966 A Writer Must Write, Not Fight'' interview, June 2009
 Доктар-іншапланетнік Бахарэвіч. 2010. Большой. 12 Oct, interview (in Belarusian)
 За што цябе адфрэндзіў Бахарэвіч?. 2016. 34mag.net. 20 Apr, interview (in Belarusian)
 Short biography (in German)
 Short biography (in English)
 Author's writings available online (in Belarusian)
 Author's books available online (in Belarusian)
 Author's column (in Belarusian)
 Author's online column in Radio Free Europe/Radio Liberty (in Belarusian)
 Author's website on facebook.com (in Belarusian)
 Author's blog (in Belarusian) (last entry in 2013)
 Launch of the Author's novel Шабаны. Гісторыя аднаго зьнікненьня Šabany. Historyja adnaho źniknieńnia
 
 АЛЬГЕРД БАХАРЭВІЧ: "Я ХАЦЕЎ БЫ, КАБ БЕЛАРУСКАЯ ПРАВІНЦЫЯ МЕНШ ЗАЛЕЖЫЛА АД МЕНСКУ". 2017. Бинокль. 11 Apr.
 Марына Міхневіч. 2018. Альгерд Бахарэвіч: «Наша Беларусь яшчэ не прачытаная светам». Бобруйский курьер. 8 Sept.
 Bacharevič and Marcinovič in Discussion at Alieksijevič's Club / Бахарэвіч і Марціновіч спрачаюцца ў клюбе Алексіевіч. 2019. Радыё Свабода. 26 Mar (in Belarusian)
 MAIDAN – The Role of Writers in Modern Society. 2019. MaidanDebate. 5 May.
 Змитер Лукашук. 2020. Бахаревич: Язык и Свобода — в этих двух словах вся наша национальная идея {Bacharevic: Language and Liberty: These Two Words Constitute Our National Idea}. Euroradio.fm. 19 Mar.
 Bacharevič on the White Revolution of Dignity in Belarus, Power, Evil and Literature: Толькі ў Беларусі быць фашыстам – гэта такая прафэсія / Бахаревич – о примитивном Зле {Only in Belarus Being a Fascist is a Job / Bacharevič on Evil}. 2020. Радыё Свабода. 12 Dec (in Belarusian)
 Concert of Pravakacyja / Канцэрт гурта "ПРАВАКАЦЫЯ" у клубе "Графіці" 4 лістапада 2016 (in Belarusian)
 Alherd Bacharevič /Aльгерд Бахарэвіч reading his story and replying tu questions in Brno Czech Republic (2007) (in Belarusian and Czech)
 

1975 births
Living people
Writers from Minsk
Belarusian translators
Maxim Tank Belarusian State Pedagogical University alumni